Hunter is an American crime drama television series created by Frank Lupo, which ran on NBC from September 18, 1984, to April 26, 1991. It stars Fred Dryer as Sgt. Rick Hunter and Stepfanie Kramer as Sgt. Dee Dee McCall. The title character Sgt. Rick Hunter is a wily, physically imposing, often rule-breaking homicide detective with the Los Angeles Police Department.

The show's executive producer during the first season was Stephen J. Cannell, whose company produced the series. Stepfanie Kramer left after the sixth season (1990) to pursue other acting and musical opportunities. In the seventh season, Hunter partnered with two different female officers.

Episodes

Season one (1984–85)
The show began in a Tuesday night time slot with the two-part pilot episodes of "Hunter" initially broadcast in a time slot on a Friday night, competing for ratings against the popular Dallas. The show struggled to attract an audience and drew criticism for its often graphic depiction of violence. In the first season, the producers sought to create a hook by giving the main character a catchphrase, "Works for me", which was sometimes used two or three times in an episode and was even added to the end of Mike Post and Pete Carpenter's opening theme music. Several early episodes featured montages set to popular songs from the 1960s, 1970s, and 1980s, in a style similar to Miami Vice.

Midway through the first season, with low ratings still, Cannell gave network chief Brandon Tartikoff a private screening of a two-part episode ("The Snow Queen") that had not yet aired, and asked him to give the show more time to attract viewers. Tartikoff agreed and put the show on hiatus until a better time slot could be found. Two months later, Hunter resumed, this time on Saturday nights, and viewership slowly started to rise. The first season finished in 65th place.

Season two (1985–86)
For its second season, Cannell brought in his mentor, Roy Huggins, best known for his work on Maverick and The Rockford Files, to refine the show. As the new executive producer, Huggins pushed up the violence but softened the main character's fractious relationship with his superiors, dropped a backstory concerning Hunter's family ties to the mob, and emphasized the chemistry between Hunter and McCall. Huggins also moved the show's setting out of the back streets and into the more desirable areas of Los Angeles. Emboldened, Dryer and Kramer frequently improvised the scripts, and the Hunter character broke the fourth wall for the first time with an aside to viewers at the end of the episode "The Beautiful and the Dead".

Probably the most memorable aspect to the second season was the two-part episode "Rape and Revenge", which may have drawn from some diplomatic-immunity scandals that were prominent in the news. A psychopathic foreign diplomat meets McCall and wants to have a relationship with her, and after she declines, he brutally rapes her in her home. Hunter is badly shot in the shoulder and must recover quickly, then go to the diplomat's home country to dispense justice, Hunter-style. This episode was considered very controversial for its realistic and shocking depiction of a violent rape, which was not common in TV shows at the time. Because of the controversial plot and acting, "Rape and Revenge" is one of the most remembered and popular episodes of the series.

Another important aspect to the second season was towards its end (in the episode "The Return of Typhoon Thompson"), when viewers were first introduced to Hunter and McCall's favorite street informant—the humorous Arnold "Sporty" James, played by Garrett Morris.

Viewers also responded to Huggins' changes, and the show's second season ended in 38th place in the Nielsen ratings. Hunter continued this progress to become a mainstay of NBC's Saturday-night schedule.

In syndication, the season-two introduction was replaced by the season-one introduction. The former showed Hunter entering a women's locker room in one scene, and McCall and him pointing their guns at each other with the bathroom light on in another scene.

Season three (1986–87)
Just before work on the third season began, Dryer threatened to quit unless his salary, reportedly US$21,000 per episode, was raised and creative changes were made. Cannell responded with a US$20 million breach-of-contract lawsuit. A compromise was reached, a new deal with Dryer reportedly earning US$50,000 per episode. The third season, again led by Huggins, added Charles Hallahan as Captain Charlie Devane, who remained Hunter and McCall's captain for the rest of the show, eventually included in the opening credits of the show and becoming one of the show's main stars (none of the previous captains in the series had achieved this). This was the show's first season in the top 30, coming in at 25th.

In the episode "Shades" (which was the season finale, but aired later in the summer, in July 1987) when Hunter went missing, McCall teamed with a somewhat ditzy Columbo-like Detective Kitty O'Hearn (Shelley Taylor Morgan). O'Hearn reappeared during the season-four three-part episode "City of Passion". Another remembered episode from season three was "Requiem For Sergeant McCall", which was a contradiction to a storyline from the beginning of the show. When the show first started, McCall's husband (Steven McCall) was supposedly killed five years before, in 1979, by a "punk" kid during a routine stop. At that time, Steven and Dee Dee were newly married and starting out as rookie uniform cops. However, in 1987, in "Requiem", just five years before (which would be around 1982 instead of 1979), Steven was a homicide detective (while Dee Dee was still just a rookie) and he was working on a big murder case that resulted in him being killed. In "Requiem", Steven's killer is getting paroled, and Dee Dee McCall is doing everything she can to get him back in prison—plus trying to solve the original murder case that her husband died trying to solve five years earlier.

Another notable episode was "Any Second Now", in which Theresa Saldana played a pianist being stalked by a psychotic fan. This was based on the real-life incident Saldana herself was a victim of when she was stalked and brutally stabbed by Scottish immigrant and drifter, Arthur Richard Jackson outside her Los Angeles home in 1982. The violent attack later became the subject of the 1984 TV film, Victims for Victims: The Theresa Saldana Story, and Jackson was then extradited to England to be tried for a 1966 robbery and murder. He was committed to a psychiatric hospital and remained there until 2004 when he died of heart failure.

Season four (1987–88)
Huggins retired at the end of the fourth season, which placed 18th in the Nielsen ratings. A three-part storyline, "City of Passion", teamed Hunter and Dee Dee with detective O'Hearn (Morgan) and her new partner, Sgt. Brad Navarro (Erik Estrada). Together, they captured the serial rapist called Big Foot. Originally, the plot of "City of Passion" involved McCall getting raped again—this time by Big Foot, and she had to deal with the pain and emotions as she did in the second season's "Rape and Revenge". However, Stepfanie Kramer immediately balked at this and argued the rape idea had already been done, and to repeat it, as well as having her character put in a situation to get raped again, was ridiculous. Kramer threatened to quit unless the script was changed. Producers and writers agreed, and a compromise was made: Big Foot attacked and attempted to rape McCall, but she fought him and prevented the rape.

Also known as one of the more memorable episodes for fourth season was "The Black Dahlia". The real-life infamous unsolved Black Dahlia LA murder case from 1947 is thrust back into headlines as bones with identical cuts to the historical case are discovered under an old building being demolished. In the episode, Hunter and McCall solve the famous murder case 41 years to the day (1947–88) as the episode aired on the anniversary date of the real-life murder. As a special message at the end states, the real-life case is still open, and the real killer has never been found.

Opening Credits changed, most notably removal of the gun and car "action" clips used in previous seasons. This reflected a change in the format where the frequent car chases and shootouts from the first three seasons were dropped and the show became more of a standard police procedural, with only occasional action scenes.

Season five (1988–89)
For the fifth season, George Geiger took on the role of executive producer, having worked in the same capacity on Scarecrow and Mrs. King, as well as a brief stint as co-executive producer on Miami Vice. In the first four seasons, Hunter and McCall typically worked on cases together, allowing the producers to showcase the chemistry between the actors, but the fifth season increasingly had them working apart, ostensibly to lessen the workload of Dryer and Kramer and to allow richer, more complex stories. So instead of jeans and an old sports jacket, Hunter often was seen in a full suit and tie.

One of the most memorable episodes of the fifth season was the special three-part episode "City Under Siege", which had a special introduction for each of the three parts. It dealt with a psychotic woman named Iris Smith (Cec Verrell) and her crazy boyfriend, Billy Joe Powell (Daniel Quinn), who terrorized the city of Los Angeles, committing multiple murders against people who the woman felt had "wronged" her in some way.

Hunter was one of the intended victims, having arrested Billy Joe years earlier for a series of murders in which he killed his female victims with a straight razor. One sub-plot focused on the huge crime spree throughout the city and the pressure the police department was under to get it under control. Another sub-plot involved a corrupt Deputy Chief named Curtis Moorehead (Robert Vaughn), who continually hamstrung the entire police department's efforts to find Iris and Billy Joe in order to further his own ends.

Further compounding the problem was Jack Small (James Sikking), a local resident who aggressively took the law into his own hands to combat the local crime wave, earning him a reputation in his neighborhood as an urban vigilante. He had a teenage daughter, Debbie (Brynn Horrocks) who was a good-hearted but troubled young woman whom McCall befriended while she was working undercover at her high school investigating the murder of one of the teachers named Sandra Clemens. Sandra was Iris' old teacher whom she had a grudge against for stopping her from stealing lunch money from a fellow student. Another subplot of the story revolved around Johnny Youngblood (Craig Hurley), a mover and shaker at the school who dealt in various shady enterprises. Also appearing in a guest-starring role was real-life journalist, Saida Pagan as television reporter, Saida Rodrigues Pagan. In part two, Laurelle Brooks guest-starred as Allison, a naive high-school cheerleader who falls under Johnny's charms and unknown to her, make a videotape of them having sex. At the end of the episode, statistics were presented showing a reduction of crime in Los Angeles that year. The fifth season placed 17th in the Nielsen ratings.

Uniformed officers costumes changed, dropping the Metro Police shoulder patch of previous four seasons, leaving the uniforms looking more the real LAPD. Door shields on patrol cars also changed to look like those of LAPD.

Season six (1989–90)
By the sixth season, Dryer's growing influence had won him the role of executive producer. Probably the most remembered episode of the sixth season was "Unfinished Business". During this episode, the audience learns that Hunter and McCall had actually once slept together, causing a rift in their working relationship. Fred Dryer stated that this episode was filmed to try to appease fans and the network, who were constantly wanting Hunter and McCall to get together. However, Fred Dryer and Stepfanie Kramer stated they did not want that to happen, because once it did, Hunter would become Hart To Hart.

Another memorable episode this season was "Yesterday's Child". In this episode, a Vietnamese man visits Hunter and pleads with him to take on the case of a robbery and murder at an upscale car dealership, of which his son was the main suspect. Over the course of the conversation, Hunter discovers that the 17-year-old suspect was actually his own son. The boy is revealed to be the product of a relationship Hunter had with a woman while he was in Vietnam.

Also for this season, homicide was moved to the more updated Parker Center, instead of the old downtown division building. However, at the end of the sixth season, which placed 26th in the Nielsen ratings, Stepfanie Kramer decided to leave the series to pursue a career in music. Kramer's character was written out in the season's two-part finale showing the McCall character marrying an old flame and moving out of Los Angeles.

Season seven (1990–91)
For the seventh and final season, NBC shifted the show to 10 pm on Wednesdays. A new female co-star, Darlanne Fluegel as Officer Joanne Molenski, was brought in. However, she reportedly had creative differences with Fred Dryer, and halfway through the season, she decided she wanted out. Her character was murdered by a female serial killer in the two-part episode "Fatal Obsession". Her replacement for the second half of the season was Lauren Lane as Sgt. Chris Novak, supposedly a former girlfriend of Hunter's. Hunter's signature unmarked vehicle, a moss green 1977 Dodge Monaco, was also finally replaced (after an accident with Molenski's cruiser in the season's first episode) by an updated new silver 1990 Ford LTD Crown Victoria. Hunter was now also back to wearing jeans and a shirt. Also for the first time (aside from the sixth-season finale), Hunter made sporadic appearances in uniform.

However, the new partners and changes did little to boost ratings (47th in the Nielsen standings). A salary dispute involving Dryer led to the show being discontinued at the end of the season.

Reunions and revivals
Four years after the original series ended, a reunion NBC TV movie, The Return of Hunter: Everyone Walks in L.A., had Dryer and Charles Hallahan reprise their roles as Rick Hunter and Charlie Devane. Hunter had now also been promoted to lieutenant. Airing on March 6, 1995, the movie seemed to take the Dirty Harry idea as the plot—a psycho wants fame and/or to be noticed and begins terrorizing the city to gain media attention. Along the way, he becomes infatuated with attention from Hunter, eventually wanting to kill him. Stepfanie Kramer, pregnant at the time, did not reprise her role as Dee Dee McCall. The TV-movie co-starred Barry Bostwick, Miguel Ferrer, and John C. McGinley.

Seven years later in November 2002, 11 years after the original series ended, the reunion TV movie Hunter: Return to Justice made its premiere to strong ratings. This time, Stepfanie Kramer returned to her role as McCall, and the show's setting switched from Los Angeles to San Diego—as Hunter's current L.A. partner is killed in the line of duty.

Given the success of the TV movie, Cannell, Dryer, and NBC attempted to bring back Hunter as a regular series: the April 2003 airing of another TV movie, Hunter: Back in Force, served as the pilot for the new series. The network decided to broadcast three new one-hour episodes of Hunter ("Vaya Sin Dios", "Untouchable", and "Dead Heat"). Another two episodes were filmed (as originally five episodes were to be aired), but never shown in the U.S, as NBC decided to cancel the new series. Fred Dryer later cited "creative difficulties" and budget constraints as the reasons for the revival's unexpected end.

Cast and crew

Original series
 Fred Dryer ... Det. Sgt. Richard "Rick" Hunter
 Stepfanie Kramer ... Det. Sgt. Dee Dee McCall (1984–90)
 Darlanne Fluegel ... Off. Joanne Molenski (1990–91)
 Lauren Lane ... Sgt. Chris Novak (1991)
 Michael Cavanaugh ... Capt. Lester D. Cain ("Pilot" Only)
 Arthur Rosenberg ... Capt. Lester D. Cain/Commander Lester D. Cain (1984/1987)
 John Amos ... Capt. Dolan (1984–85)
 Bruce Davison ... Capt. Wyler/Dep. Chief Wyler (1985–86/1987)
 Charles Hallahan ... Capt. Charles "Charlie" Devane (1986–91)
 John Shearin ... Lt. Ambrose Finn (1985–88)
 James Whitmore Jr. ... Sgt. Bernie Terwilliger (1984–86)
 Garrett Morris ... Arnold "Sporty" James (1986–89)
 Richard Beauchamp ... Carlos (Asst. M.E.) (1985–87)
 Perry Cook ... Barney Udall (Coroner) (1986–90)
 Stanley Kamel ... Gov. Agent Brad Wilkes (Occasional) (1987–88)
 Paul Mantee ... Commander Tom Clayton (Occasional) (1989-1991)
 Courtney Barilla ... Allison Novak (1991)
 Robert Firth ... Det. Riley Causland (1986)

Revival series
 Fred Dryer ... Det. Lt. Richard "Rick" Hunter
 Stepfanie Kramer ... Det. Sgt. Dee Dee McCall
 Mike Gomez ... Capt. Roberto Gallardo
 Michelle Gold ... Off./Det. Cynthia Monetti
 Sid Sham ... Off./Det. Sid Keyes
 Meredyth Hunt ... Det. Krysta Carson (TV movies only) (2002–2003)
 Frank Grillo ... Det. Terence Gillette (TV movies only) (2002–2003)
 Kenneth Taylor ... Off. Mueller (TV movies only) (2002–2003)
 Robert Crow ... Off. Wilcher (TV movies only) (2002–2003)
 Alex Mendoza ... Det. Anthony Santiago (series episodes only) (2003)

Production

Vehicles
In the pilot television film, Hunter drove a blue 1977 Dodge Monaco and a 1970 Ford LTD. Because Hunter constantly was getting into wrecks chasing suspects and regularly "busted" up any police car he was given, the department would only issue him older model cars that would barely run. Once the series started (fall 1984), during the first season, Hunter drove a 1972 Chevrolet Impala, a 1971 Chevrolet Nova, a 1974 Plymouth Satellite, and a 1979 Chevrolet Caprice Classic. A 1971 Impala was actually shown exploding to end the episodes using Chevrolets. Monacos seemed to be the police car of choice, as the second season had Hunter occasionally driving a junker multiple-colored side panel 1977 Monaco (jokingly referred to as the "Partridge Family" Monaco), as well as other '77 models in yellow, brown, and black. After the show was more "established" and starting with the third season and through the first episode of seventh season, Hunter drove a moss green 1977 Monaco. This car was in better condition than the previous Monacos and became Hunter's trademark vehicle — to the point that when it was destroyed in the third season, it was replaced with an identical one. During the seventh and last season, Detective Hunter drove a new silver 1990 Ford LTD Crown Victoria.

During the first two seasons, McCall drove a garnet red and silver 1984 Dodge Daytona Turbo Z. Then starting with season three and on through season five, McCall drove a bright red 1987 Daytona Shelby Z (Sometimes though, a "Turbo Z" badge on this Daytona is also clearly visible). During the sixth season - her final season, she drove a gold-colored 1990 Dodge Dynasty. (An episode during the fourth or fifth season showed the outside of what was supposedly McCall's house and a yellow 1987 Ford Mustang was out front. However, McCall is only shown driving it once and then it was never shown again.)

Both Officer Joanne Molenski and Sgt. Chris Novak, during last season, drove a tan/beige 1990 LTD Crown Victoria.

In the first reunion film, The Return of Hunter: Everyone Walks in L.A., Hunter drove a black 1995 Ford Crown Victoria. In Hunter: Return to Justice, McCall drove a silver 2002 Mercedes Benz CLK320 convertible. In Hunter: Back in Force and the subsequent new series, Hunter drove a black 2003 Crown Victoria Police Interceptor and McCall occasionally drove a black 2003 Ford Expedition.

Film 
In 2009, a film adaptation was announced to be in development with a screenplay by Frank Lupo and Fred Dryer, to be directed by Lupo for Columbia Pictures, Anchor Bay Films, and Warner Bros. Pictures.

Home media
Anchor Bay Entertainment released the first three seasons of Hunter on Region 1 DVD between January 2005 and January 2006. Due to poor sales, no further seasons were released.

On October 14, 2009, Mill Creek Entertainment was announced to have acquired the rights to several Stephen J. Cannell series, including Hunter. They subsequently re-released the first two seasons on DVD.

On July 27, 2010, Mill Creek released Hunter - The Complete Series, a 28-disc collection featuring all 152 episodes of the series.

On November 10, 2011, Mill Creek Entertainment released The Return of Hunter TV special on DVD in a four-pack.

On November 12, 2015, Tiberius Film in Germany released Hunter - The Complete Series, a 42-disc collection featuring all 152 episodes of the series in a special edition case, complete with an episode guide and collector's cards. The same collection was released as a standard edition on May 4, 2017. These releases are encoded Region 2.

Due to music rights issues, on both the Anchor Bay Entertainment and Mill Creek Home Entertainment, certain original songs throughout the series have been replaced with newer recordings. The German releases from Tiberius Film are complete and uncut, featuring the original broadcast soundtracks.

On April 29, 2022, Visual Entertainment released Hunter - The Complete TV Series, a special collection featuring all 152 episodes of the series plus the TV movie The Return of Hunter.

International airings
 In Australia, the show was shown on the regional station GTS/BKN and PRIME. It also screened on Thursday nights at 9.30 on STW - 9 in Perth in the '80s, and ATN - 7 in Sydney in the '80s.
 In Barbados, the show was shown on CBC TV 8.
 In Brazil, the show was shown on Rede Globo, dubbed in Portuguese.
 In Canada, the show was shown on the Global Television Network.
 In China, the show was dubbed in Standard Chinese and aired on STV. Hunter was one of the first US series to air regularly in China. Kramer was invited to China to sing at the Shanghai TV & Film Festival. Both Dryer and Kramer are still widely recognized in China. Dryer's efforts to set a Hunter movie there in the late 1990s did not bear fruit. The Hunter TV series is a favorite of the disgraced former Beijing Mayor Chen Xitong, who had quoted the name, character, and events of the TV series in various speeches he delivered.
 In Mexico, the series was shown as El Cazador. It was broadcast by Televisa Network on Canal Cinco.
 In Chile, the series was shown (until the sixth season) as Hunter on TVN
 In Croatia, the show was shown on HRT.
 In Colombia, the series was presented as El Cazador. It was broadcast by Producciones JES on Cadena Uno every Saturday night at 21:45, from 1987 to 1991. The final season was never aired in Colombia.
 In Costa Rica, the show was shown on Teletica Canal 7 as El cazador.
 In Czech Republic, the show was shown on TV Prima.
 In Denmark, the show was shown on DR1.
 In Egypt, the show was shown on القناة الثانية (Channel 2) a lot during the '90s.
 In Estonia, the show was shown on TV3.
 In Finland, the show was shown on MTV3 Sarja.
 In France, the show was shown on TF1 as Rick Hunter.
 In Germany, the show was shown on Sat.1.
 In Greece, the show was shown on Star Channel.
 In Hungary, the show was shown on Viasat 3.
 In Gibraltar, the show was shown on GBC TV Gibraltar Broadcasting Corporation.
 In Hong Kong, ATV broadcast the show.
 In Indonesia, the show was shown on TVRI.
 In India, the show was shown on Star Plus.
 In Ireland, the show was shown on RTÉ One.
 In Israel, the show was shown on Israel 10.
 In Italy, the show was shown on Rai Due.
 In Japan, the show was shown on TBS and TV Tokyo.
 In Lebanon, the show was shown on the Lebanese tv station LBCI.
 In South Korea, the show was shown on SBS.
 In Macedonia, the show was shown on MRT.
 In Norway, the show was shown on NRK (in 1986).
 In Pakistan, the show was aired on Pakistan Television (PTV)
 In the Philippines, the show was aired on RPN-9.
 In Portugal, the show was aired on RTP 1.
 In Russia, the show was aired on NTV.
 In Serbia, the show was aired on FOX Crime.
 In Slovakia, the show was aired on Markíza.
 In Sweden, the show was shown on TV4.
 In Thailand, the show was shown on Channel 3.
 In Turkey, the show was shown on Star TV and Kanal D.
 In the United Kingdom, the first two seasons aired regionally on terrestrial broadcaster ITV, the remainder on satellite/cable channel Sky One.

See also
 Sledge Hammer!, a parody show with a similar lead character

References

External links 
 
  (revival)

1984 American television series debuts
1991 American television series endings
1980s American crime drama television series
1980s American mystery television series
1990s American crime drama television series
1990s American mystery television series
American detective television series
American television series revived after cancellation
American action television series
English-language television shows
Fictional portrayals of the Los Angeles Police Department
NBC original programming
Rape in television
Television series by Sony Pictures Television
Television shows set in Los Angeles
Television series by Stephen J. Cannell Productions
Television series created by Frank Lupo